Ian Paul Butcher (born 1 July 1962) is a former English first-class cricketer. He is the brother of former England Test player Alan Butcher and uncle of Mark Butcher.

Butcher was a regular opening batsman for Leicestershire during the 1980s, topping 1000 runs in a season twice. In 1988 he moved to Gloucestershire but was released after a couple of seasons.

References

External links

1962 births
Living people
English cricketers
Leicestershire cricketers
Gloucestershire cricketers
English cricket coaches